Lombe is a surname. Notable people with the surname include: 

Edward Lombe (disambiguation), several people
John Lombe (1693–1722), English silk spinner
Thomas Lombe (1685–1739), English merchant

See also
Lombe Chibesakunda (born 1944), Zambian lawyer and diplomat